Pilgrim's Rest (also Nob Hill) is an unincorporated community in Brush Creek Township, Washington County, Arkansas, United States.

References

Unincorporated communities in Washington County, Arkansas
Unincorporated communities in Arkansas